Trinity Lutheran Christian School & Early Learning Center (TLCS) is a private K-8 Christian school in the Joppa community and in the Edgewood census-designated place in Harford County, Maryland. 

Trinity serves families with children ages 6 weeks to 8th Grade.

References

External links
 

Christian schools in Maryland
Private elementary schools in Maryland
Private middle schools in Maryland
Schools in Harford County, Maryland